The Eisenhower Birthplace State Historic Site is located at 609 S. Lamar Avenue in Denison, Grayson County,  in the U.S. state of Texas. President Dwight D. Eisenhower was born in the house on October 14, 1890, the first United States President to be born in Texas.

Background
Eisenhower's military success as Supreme Allied Commander Europe during World War II prompted local Denison school principal Jennie Jackson to correspond with General Eisenhower. She inquired if he was from the Eisenhower family she remembered in Denison.  His family had moved to Kansas when he was two years old, and until he received Jackson's letter, he was unaware he had been born in Denison.  Eisenhower's mother Ida Elizabeth Stover was still alive at the time, and he put his mother in touch with Jackson.  Upon hearing from Eisenhower's mother that this was indeed his birthplace, Jackson set about to raise funds to purchase the two-story frame house. After the purchase, the house was then donated to the city of Denison, Texas. The museum was established in 1955. After Eisenhower was elected President, the Eisenhower Foundation was formed in 1953 for restoration. The Foundation created a park by removing several other houses in the nearby vicinity, and doing landscaping improvements. In 1958, the restored home and surrounding park was donated to the State Parks Board. On January 1, 2008,  the Eisenhower Birthplace was transferred from the Texas Parks and Wildlife Department to the Texas Historical Commission.

The home was designated a Recorded Texas Historic Landmark.

Gallery

See also

List of Texas state historic sites
National Register of Historic Places listings in Grayson County, Texas
Recorded Texas Historic Landmarks in Grayson County
Museums in North Texas
Eisenhower State Park (Texas)

References

External links

Eisenhower Birthplace State Historic Site official website

Texas state historic sites
Protected areas of Grayson County, Texas
Dwight D. Eisenhower
Historic house museums in Texas
Presidential homes in the United States
Recorded Texas Historic Landmarks
Museums in Grayson County, Texas
Presidential museums in Texas
Birthplaces of individual people